Michael Vincent Clay (born August 30, 1991) is a former American football linebacker and coach who is the special teams coordinator for the Philadelphia Eagles of the National Football League (NFL).

Playing career
On April 27, 2013, Clay signed with the Miami Dolphins as an undrafted free agent. He was released from the team during final roster cuts on August 27, 2013.

Coaching career
On January 27, 2014, Clay was hired as defensive quality control coach for the Philadelphia Eagles under head coach Chip Kelly. He was promoted to assistant special teams coach on February 3, 2015.

On January 27, 2016, it was announced that he would be the assistant special teams coach of the San Francisco 49ers. On January 29, 2021, Clay was hired as the special teams coordinator for the Philadelphia Eagles.

References

External links
Philadelphia Eagles bio
Oregon Ducks bio

1991 births
Living people
Sportspeople from Santa Clara, California
Players of American football from California
Oregon Ducks football players
Philadelphia Eagles coaches
San Francisco 49ers coaches
Miami Dolphins players